Saint Mark's Cathedral may refer to several cathedrals named for Saint Mark (Mark the Evangelist):

Croatia
 Korčula Cathedral

Egypt 
 Saint Mark's Coptic Orthodox Cathedral (Alexandria)
 Saint Mark's Coptic Orthodox Cathedral, Abbassia, Cairo
 Saint Mark's Coptic Orthodox Cathedral, Azbakeya, Cairo

India
 St. Mark's Cathedral, Bangalore

Italy
 St Mark's Basilica in Venice
 San Marco Evangelista al Campidoglio, Rome
 San Marco, Florence

Mexico
 St. Mark's Cathedral, Tuxtla Gutiérrez

South Africa
St Mark's Cathedral, George, Western Cape

United States
St. Mark's Cathedral (Shreveport, Louisiana) (Episcopal)
St. Mark's Episcopal Cathedral (Minneapolis), Minnesota
St. Mark's Pro-Cathedral (Hastings, Nebraska) (Episcopal)
St. Mark's Cathedral (Salt Lake City), Utah (Episcopal)
St. Mark's Episcopal Cathedral, Seattle, Washington

See also
 St. Mark's Church (disambiguation)
 St. Mark's (disambiguation)
 Saint Mark's Coptic Orthodox Church (disambiguation)
 St. Mark's Episcopal Church (disambiguation)
 St. Mark's Episcopal Cathedral (disambiguation)